Terna Dam is an earthfill dam on Terna river near Osmanabad in the state of Maharashtra in India.

Specifications

Purpose
The main purpose of the dam is to supply water for irrigation and domestic purpose to nearby villages. Earlier, it was used to supply the water to Osmanabad city.

See also
 Dams in Maharashtra
 List of reservoirs and dams in India

References

Dams in Osmanabad district
Dams completed in 1970
1970 establishments in Maharashtra